Eosin B is a form of eosin which is a  dye compound. There is another form of eosin B dye and his chemical name is  4, 5-dibromo-2, 7dinitro- fluorescein or 4′,5′-dibromo-2′,7′-dinitro-3-oxo-3Hspiro[2-benzofuran-1,9′-xanthene]-3′,6′ diolate.. This last form of eosin B is an organic laser dye and  its molecular formula is C20H8Br2N2O9.

References 

Nitro compounds
Bromoarenes
Fluorone dyes
Benzoic acids
Triarylmethane dyes